Stockton may refer to:

Places

Australia

 Stockton, New South Wales
 Stockton, Queensland,  a locality in the Cassowary Coast Region

New Zealand 

Stockton, New Zealand

United Kingdom

Stockton, Cheshire
Stockton, Norfolk
Stockton, Chirbury with Brompton, Shropshire
Stockton, Telford and Wrekin, a location in Shropshire; see List of United Kingdom locations
Stockton, Worfield, Shropshire
Stockton, Warwickshire
Stockton, Wiltshire
Stockton Heath, a suburb of Warrington, Cheshire
Stockton-on-Tees, County Durham, the largest town in the UK with this name
Stockton on Teme, Worcestershire
Stockton-on-the-Forest, North Yorkshire

United States

Stockton, Alabama
Stockton, California, the largest US city named Stockton
Stockton, Camden, a neighborhood in Camden, New Jersey
Stockton, Georgia
Stockton, Illinois
Stockton, Indiana
Stockton, Iowa
Stockton, Kansas
Stockton, Maryland
Stockton, Minnesota
Stockton, Missouri
Stockton, New Jersey
Stockton, New York
Stockton, San Diego, a neighborhood in San Diego, California
Stockton, Utah
Stockton, Wisconsin, a town
Stockton (community), Wisconsin, an unincorporated community
Fort Stockton, Texas
Stockton Springs, Maine
Stockton Street (San Francisco), California, United States
Stockton Township (disambiguation)

People 
Stockton (surname)
Earl of Stockton

Transportation
Stockton Airport (disambiguation)
Stockton and Darlington Railway, England
Stockton – San Joaquin Street (Amtrak station), California 
Stockton station (disambiguation)

Other uses
Stockton (Woodville, North Carolina), an historic plantation house
Stockton University, New Jersey, United States
USS Stockton

See also
Justice Stockton (disambiguation)